Landmark Cases in the Law of Contract (2008) is a book by Charles Mitchell and Paul Mitchell, which outlines the key cases in English contract law.

Content
The cases discussed are,

Coggs v Barnard (1703) on bailment
Pillans v Van Mierop (1765) on the doctrine of consideration
Carter v Boehm (1766) on good faith
Da Costa v Jones (1778)
Hochster v De La Tour (1853) on anticipatory breach
Smith v Hughes (1871) on unilateral mistake and the objective approach to interpretation of contracts
Foakes v Beer (1884) on part payments of debt (with a notable dissenting opinion by Lord Blackburn)
The Hong Kong Fir (1961) on innominate terms, allowing the court remedial flexibility
Suisse Atlantique Societe d'Armament SA v NV Rotterdamsche Kolen Centrale (1966)
Rearden Smith Lines Ltd v Yngvar Hansen Tangan or The Diana Prosperity (1976) 1 WLR 989 on a contextual approach to contractual interpretation  
Johnson v Agnew (1979) that damages are to be assessed on the date when a breach can reasonably be discovered neither any cost

Reception 
The book received reviews from publications including the Singapore Journal of Legal Studies, The Journal of Legal History, Revue trimestrielle de droit civil, and the Australian Banking and Finance Law Bulletin.

See also
Landmark case
Restitution in English law
Landmark Cases in the Law of Restitution (2006) by Charles Mitchell and Paul Mitchell
Landmark Cases in the Law of Tort (2010) by Charles Mitchell and Paul Mitchell
Landmark Cases in Family Law (2011) by Stephen Gilmore, Jonathan Herring and Rebecca Probert
Landmark Cases in Equity (2012) by Charles Mitchell and Paul Mitchell (6 Jul 2012)

References 

English contract law
2008 non-fiction books
Law books